Kalinkino is a rural locality (a village) in Mayskoye Rural Settlement, Vologodsky District, Vologda Oblast, Russia. The population was 36 as of 2002.

Geography 
The distance to Vologda is 32 km, to Maysky is 16 km. Pochenga, Knyazhevo, Rossolovo, Tretnikovo, Zarya, Osinnik are the nearest rural localities.

References 

Rural localities in Vologodsky District